The prime minister of Orissa was the head of government and the Leader of the House in the Legislative Assembly of Orissa Province in British India. The position was dissolved upon the independence of India in 1947.

History 
The office was created under the Government of India Act 1935. During the 1937 Indian provincial elections, the Indian National Congress won 36 seats in Orissa, while other parties and independents won 24 seats. The first premiership was held by the influential aristocrat and independent legislator Sir Krushna Chandra Gajapati for 80 days. Bishwanath Das, a provincial legislator of the Congress, then claimed the right to form the government, despite the pan-Indian Congress policy of boycotting constitutional governments. The Das ministry lasted until 1939. Sir Gajapati then formed a second government in 1941, which lasted until 1944. Sir Gajapati is regarded as the architect of the modern Indian state of Orissa (now Odisha). During the 1946 Indian provincial elections, the Congress won 47 seats. Congress leader Harekrushna Mahatab became the last Prime Minister of Odisha but   the first elected Chief Minister of Orissa was Nabakrushna Choudhury.

Office holders

See also
Legislatures of British India

References

Prime Ministers of British India
Provinces of British India